Little Comfort is a  hamlet in the parish of Lezant in east Cornwall, England, UK.

References

Hamlets in Cornwall